Ptilomacra senex is a species of carpenter moth in the family Cossidae. They are commonly called "Wood Moths" They are found in the southeast quarter of mainland Australia, such as in Queensland, New South Wales, Victoria, and South Australia  Adult moths have a light and dark fawn pattern on their wings, and they have a wingspan of approximately 10 cm

References

Further reading

 

Cossidae
Articles created by Qbugbot
Moths described in 1855